Carolina Theatre, also known as the Carolina Civic Center, is a historic movie theater located at Lumberton, Robeson County, North Carolina.  It was built in 1927–1928, and is a three-story, Italian Renaissance style brick and terra cotta building.  The theatre closed in 1975 amid a general exodus of businesses from downtown Lumberton. Plans were made to demolish it and build a parking lot, but community activists lobbied to have the building spared. It was reopened as the Carolina Civic Center in 1985 and underwent renovations in 2008.

It was added to the National Register of Historic Places in 1981.  It is located in the Lumberton Commercial Historic District at 319 North Chestnut Street.

References

External links

Carolina Civic Center website

Theatres on the National Register of Historic Places in North Carolina
Renaissance Revival architecture in North Carolina
Theatres completed in 1928
Buildings and structures in Robeson County, North Carolina
National Register of Historic Places in Robeson County, North Carolina
Individually listed contributing properties to historic districts on the National Register in North Carolina
1928 establishments in North Carolina